The following is a list of notable deaths in June 1996.

Entries for each day are listed alphabetically by surname. A typical entry lists information in the following sequence:
 Name, age, country of citizenship at birth, subsequent country of citizenship (if applicable), reason for notability, cause of death (if known), and reference.

June 1996

1
Vittorino Colombo, 71, Italian politician.
Gaetano Fichera, 74, Italian mathematician.
Michael Fox, 75, American actor, pneumonia.
Don Grolnick, 48, American musician, lymphoma.
Attiqur Rahman, 77, Pakistani general and military historian.
Neelam Sanjiva Reddy, 83, Sixth President of India, pneumonia.

2
John Alton, 94, American cinematographer (An American in Paris), Oscar winner (1952).
Ishmael Bernal, 57, Filipino director, cardiovascular disease.
Rene Bond, 45, American pornographic actress, cirrhosis.
Ray Combs, 40, American stand-up comedian, actor, and game-show host (Family Feud), suicide by hanging.
Stewart Evans, 87, Canadian ice hockey player (Montreal Canadiens).
Alberto Farnese, 69, Italian actor.
Leon Garfield, 74, English children's writer, cancer.
Pilar Lorengar, 68, Spanish operatic soprano, lung cancer.
Amos Tversky, 59, Israeli psychologist, melanoma.
William Van Pelt, 91, American politician.

3
Arthur J. O. Anderson, 88, American anthropologist specializing in Aztec culture.
Veniero Colasanti, 85, Italian costume designer, set decorator and art director.
Ben Couch, 70, New Zealand politician and rugby union player.
William Cox, 91, American long-distance runner.
Peter Glenville, 82, English actor director and producer, myocardial infarction.
Ferdinand Leitner, 84, German composer and conductor.
Tito Okello, 82, President of Uganda.
Hideo Sakai, 86, Japanese association football player, pneumonia.
Gitchandra Tongbra, 83, Indian satirist, poet, playwright and art academic.
Aimo Tukiainen, 78, Finnish sculptor.

4
María Luisa Anido, 89, Spanish musician.
Cliff Holton, 67, English football player.
Nel Roos-Lodder, 82, Dutch discus thrower.
Aloha Wanderwell, 89, Canadian-American explorer, author, filmmaker, and aviator.

5
Erich Bagge, 84, German physicist.
Jack Beaton, 82, Australian rugby player.
Patrick Cordier, 49, French alpinist, traffic collision.
Hartono Rekso Dharsono, 70, Indonesian general.
Jan Kerouac, 44, American writer and only child author Jack Kerouac and Joan Haverty Kerouac.
Vito Scotti, 78, American actor, lung cancer.
Anne-Marie Ørbeck, 85, Norwegian pianist and composer.

6
Harry Andersson, 83, Swedish football player.
Bruce Andrew, 88, Australian football player.
Hall Hibbard, 92, American aerospace engineer.
Courtney Johnson, 56, American banjo player, lung cancer.
Vladimír Karfík, 94, Czech architect.
Kusuo Kitamura, 78, Japanese swimmer.
Rajmund Kupareo, 81, Croatian poet.
Mary Lee, 71, American actress.
George Davis Snell, 92, American geneticist.
José María Valverde, 70, Spanish philosopher.

7
Buddy Blair, 85, American Major League Baseball player.
Percy Edwards, 88, English entertainer and ornithologist.
Marjorie Gross, 40, Canadian television producer, ovarian cancer.
David Allan Hubbard, 68, American theologian and professor.
Fumi Kojima, 79, Japanese track and field athlete.

8
William J. Baroody, Jr., 58, American government official, lung ailment.
Scoop Putnam, 83, American basketball player.
Phyllis Stedman, 79, British politician and life peer.
Henryk Trębicki, 55, Polish weightlifter.

9
Rafaela Aparicio, 90, Spanish actress, cerebral hemorrhage.
Daniel Mazia, 83, American cell biologist.
Salme Reek, 88, Estonian actress.
Walter Stokes, 98, American sport shooter.
Nhiek Tioulong, 87, Cambodian politician.

10
Aleksandr Abushakhmetov, 41, Russian fencer.
Hugh Mitchell, 89, American politician.
Frankie Sakai, 67, Japanese comedian, actor, and musician.
Chiyo Uno, 98, Japanese writer, pneumonia.
Jo Van Fleet, 80, American actress (East of Eden, Cool Hand Luke, The Rose Tattoo), Oscar winner (1956).
Marie-Louise von Motesiczky, 89, Austrian artist.

11
Ulysses Dove, 49, American dancer, AIDS-related complications.
Lonne Elder III, 68, American actor and dramatist.
George Hees, 85, Canadian politician.
Brigitte Helm, 90, German actress.
Wilson W. Wyatt, 90, American politician and lawyer.

12
Mary Field, 87, American film actress, stroke.
John Hopper, 73, American politician.
Annie Ruth Jiagge, 77, Ghanaian jurist and women's rights activist.
Manibhai J. Patel, 75, Indian politician.
Lillian Yarbo, 91, American actress.

13
Edward Dugmore, 81, American artist, cancer.
Friedrich Geiger, 88, German automobile designer of notably the Mercedes-Benz 300 SL.
Pran Nath, 77, Indian singer, heart failure.
Keith Palmer, 38, American musician, cancer.
Merceditas Valdés, 73, Cuban singer.

14
Gesualdo Bufalino, 75, Italian writer, traffic collision.
Noemí Gerstein, 87, Argentine artist and sculptor.
Alexander Knyazhinsky, 60, Soviet/Russian cinematographer, noted for his work on Andrei Tarkovsky's Stalker.
Jack Ragland, 82, American basketball player.

15
Sir Fitzroy MacLean, 1st Baronet, 85, Scottish soldier, writer and politician.
Allenby Chilton, 77, English football player and manager.
Bernard A. Clarey, 84, United States Navy admiral.
Ella Fitzgerald, 79, American jazz singer, sometimes referred to as the "First Lady of Song", "Queen of Jazz", and "Lady Ella", stroke.
Jean Gimpel, 77, French historian and medievalist.
Robert Lamoot, 85, Belgian football player.
Dick Murdoch, 49, American professional wrestler, myocardial infarction.
Roosseno, 87, Indonesian politician, scholar, and engineer.
Raymond Salles, 75, French rower.

16
Mel Allen, 83, American sports announcer.
Harold Emerson Foster, 90, American basketball player-coach.
Princess Margarita, Princess of Hohenzollern, 64, German princess, suicide.
David Mourão-Ferreira, 69, Portuguese writer and poet.
Richard Sylvan, 60, Australian philosopher.
Adriano Vignoli, 88, Italian road bicycle racer.

17
George Adomian, 74, American mathematician of Armenian descent.
Madhukar Dattatraya Deoras, 80, Indian politician and third Sarsanghchalak of the RSS.
Gizella Farkas, 70, Hungarian table tennis player.
James Hamilton, 53, British DJ and journalist.
Doug Harris, 77, New Zealand runner.
Thomas Kuhn, 73, American historian, physicist and philosopher, lung cancer.
Edmond Roudnitska, 91, French perfumer.
Curt Swan, 76, American comic book artist (Superman).

18
Florence Andrews, 83, New Zealand fencer.
Branko Bošnjak, 73, Croatian philosopher.
Gino Bramieri, 67, Italian actor, pancreatic cancer.
Pierre Chany, 73, French cycling journalist.
Erika Dannhoff, 86, German actress.
Miriam Gideon, 89, American composer.
Glenmor, 64, French protest singer known as Emile Le Scanf.
Paul Heinemann, 80, Belgian botanist and mycologist.
Endel Puusepp, 87, Soviet bomber pilot and Hero of the Soviet Union.
Henry Regnery, 84, American newspaper publisher .
Rif Rəis uğlı Səyetgərəyev, 35, Russian speedway rider.

19
Frank Eliscu, 83, American sculptor and art teacher.
Vivian Ellis, 92, British musical composer.
Eric Fisher, 71, New Zealand cricket player.
Hillevi Rombin, 62, Swedish model, aviation accident.
Gerard David Schine, 68, American politician, plane crash.
Michel Ter-Pogossian, 71, American physicist.
Edvin Wide, 100, Swedish middle- and long distance runner.

20
Renato Archer, 73, Brazilian politician.
John Buchan, 2nd Baron Tweedsmuir, 84, British peer and son of novelist John Buchan, 1st Baron Tweedsmuir.
Herbert Gerigk, 91, German musicologist.
Joseph Green, 96, American actor and film director.
Wálter Guevara, 84, President of Bolivia.
Irving P. Krick, 89-90, American meteorologist and inventor, heart failure.
Louis Lefkowitz, 91, American politician, Parkinson's disease.

21
John Wesley Fletcher, 56, American pastor, AIDS-related complications.
Cyril Holmes, 81, English sprinter.
Reidar Karlsen, 85, Norwegian football player.
Mary Mead, 61, American politician, fall from horse.

22
George Barati, 83, American composer and conductor.
Terrel Bell, 74, American World War II veteran and politician, pulmonary fibrosis.
Norvell William Emerson, 58, American politician, lung cancer.
Epaminondas Samartzidis, 30, Olympic water polo player, drowning.

23
Ludovico Avio, 63, Argentine football player.
Pasqualino De Santis, 69, Italian cinematographer, heart attack.
Marian Gilman, 81, American swimmer, Olympic athlete.
Ray Lindwall, 74, Australian cricket player.
Yasapalitha Nanayakkara, 56, Sri Lankan writer.
Andreas Papandreou, 77, Greek politician, cardiovascular disease.
Hazel Redick-Smith, 70, South African tennis player.
Mariano Rojas, 23, Spanish bicycle racer, traffic collision.
Salah Abu Seif, 81, Egyptian film director.
Norbertas Vėlius, 58, Lithuanian folklorist specializing in Lithuanian mythology.

24
Harry Dowda, 73, American gridiron football player.
Grace Ho, 89, Mother of Bruce Lee.
Edward Halsey Jenison, 88, American politician and newspaper publisher.
Osman Karabegović, 84, Yugoslav politician.
Chao Lei, 68, Hong Kong actor, pneumonia.
Peter Thullen, 88, German mathematician.

25
Ray Howard-Jones, 93, English painter.
Vytautas Kavolis, 65, Lithuanian sociologist.
Siegfried Rossner, 82, German fencer and Olympian.
Hans Stam, 77, Dutch water polo player.

26
Caleb J. Anderson, 85, Swedish politician.
Veronica Guerin, 37, Irish crime reporter, homicide.
Pedro Montañez, 82, Puerto Rican boxer.
J. Lee Rankin, 88, American lawyer and United States Solicitor General.
Eduard Zahariev, 57, Bulgarian film director and screenwriter.

27
Peter Adair, 52, American filmmaker and artist, AIDS-related complications.
Mollie Beattie, 49, American conservationist and director of the United States Fish and Wildlife Service, brain cancer.
Victor Borg, 80, Norwegian physician, novelist, playwright and script writer.
Albert R. Broccoli, 87, American film producer (Dr. No, Goldfinger, Chitty Chitty Bang Bang), heart failure.
Merze Tate, 91, American academic.

28
Julio Bolbochán, 76, Argentine chess player.
Ivan Jazbinšek, 81, Yugoslavian football player.
Ali Said, 69, Indonesian military officer, Chief Justice, and politician.
Ola Solum, 52, Norwegian film director, cancer.
Kwan Tak-hing, 91, Hong Kong actor, pancreatic cancer.
Isao Yamagata, 80, Japanese actor, tuberculosis.

29
Richard Krebs, 89, German sprinter.
Pamela Mason, 80, English actress, screenwriter.
Alexander George Ogston, 85, Australian biochemist.
Dmitri Pokrovsky, 52, Russian musician and folk music researcher.

30
Antonio Franco Florensa, 84, Spanish football player.
Jef Maes, 91, Belgian musician.
Jerry May, 52, American baseball player, farming accident.
David McCampbell, 86, United States Navy officer and Medal of Honor recipient.
Lakis Petropoulos, 63, Greek football player.

References 

1996-06
 06